Duru is a ward and village in Tanzania. Duru may also refer to

Duru (surname)
Duru (tribe), a Bedouin tribe of the United Arab Emirates (UAE).
Duru languages spoken in northern Cameroon and eastern Nigeria
Ad Duru`, a village in eastern Yemen
Duru–Kleinert transformation in Quantum mechanics
Duru, Silvan